The 2016 Saskatchewan Roughriders season was the 59th season for the team in the Canadian Football League and their 107th season overall. The Roughriders finished in 5th place in the West Division with a 5–13 record and missed the playoffs for the second straight year.

The Roughriders improved upon their 3–15 record from 2015, but were eliminated from the playoffs three days after recording their fourth win, making this the second straight season that the Roughriders missed the playoffs. For the fourth consecutive season, the club held their training camp at Griffiths Stadium in Saskatoon with the main camp beginning on May 29. In week 16 on October 10, 2016, the Roughriders were officially eliminated from post-season contention, after the Montreal Alouettes lost to the Edmonton Eskimos.

Offseason

CFL draft
The 2016 CFL Draft took place on May 10, 2016. The Roughriders had seven selections in the eight-round draft, including the first overall selection following a league-worst 3-15 record in 2015.

On December 7, 2015, the Roughriders announced they had hired former Edmonton Eskimos head coach Chris Jones as new head coach and general manager after a 3-15 season in 2015. Jones had won the 103rd Grey Cup with the Eskimos a week before being hired by the Roughriders. On December 9, Jones hired John Murphy, assistant general manager of the Calgary Stampeders, as the Roughriders' new VP of player personnel. On December 15, the Roughriders cut 19 players, including veterans Tyron Brackenridge, Weldon Brown and Taj Smith. On December 18, the Roughriders traded defensive lineman Andre Monroe to the Toronto Argonauts in exchange for offensive lineman Jarriel King. On December 21, the Roughriders released more veterans, this time Tristan Jackson and Paul McCallum.

In the new year, the Roughriders made more signings, including Caesar Rayford on January 8, and Derrius Brooks on January 11. They would also acquire receiver Maurice Price from the Redblacks. On January 16, the Roughriders released veterans Weston Dressler and John Chick, a move that received backlash from fans despite the move freeing up cap space. Dressler had signed a 4-year contract extension less than a year prior. Dressler would go on to sign with the Winnipeg Blue Bombers, while Chick moved east to sign with the Hamilton Tiger-Cats. On January 17, the Roughriders signed veteran defensive lineman Shawn Lemon. On January 20, the Roughriders restructured the contract of Darian Durant, a move that freed up cap space.

In the days leading up to CFL Free Agency, the Roughriders re-signed Spencer Moore and Rob Bagg, and on free agency day, re-signed veteran offensive lineman Chris Best. Veteran linebacker Shea Emry would announce his retirement from the league. The Roughriders would be busy during free agency, signing receivers John Chiles, Jeremy Kelley and Shamawd Chambers, offensive lineman Andrew Jones, linebacker Greg Jones, running back Curtis Steele, returner Kendial Lawrence and defensive lineman Justin Capicciotti. They would also acquire defensive backs Graig Newman, Otha Foster and Ed Gainey. The team would make trades as well, acquiring Bruce Campbell from the Argonauts and Tevaughn Campbell from the Stampeders. There would be releases as well, such as Keenan MacDougall and Jake Doughty.

On March 23, 2016, the Roughriders released an updated version of their logo that has been used since 1985. That same day, the Roughriders signed former Stampeders national running back Matt Walter.

Pre-season 
The 2016 season was the Roughriders' final season at Mosaic Stadium at Taylor Field, where they played for their first 107 years of existence. The new Mosaic Stadium, under construction during the 2016 CFL season, was completed in late 2016. The Roughriders subsequently moved into the stadium in time for the 2017 season. In December 2015, the team launched its "Farewell Season" campaign, which featured tributes leading up to and during the season, and branded merchandise featuring a commemorative logo.

Regular season

Season standings

Schedule

Team

Roster

Coaching staff

References

Saskatchewan Roughriders seasons
2016 Canadian Football League season by team
Saskatchewan Roughriders